Roberta Lucca (born 1978) is a British-Brazilian entrepreneur, and the co-founder and marketer-in-chief of the game developer Bossa Studios. The company has won a BAFTA and raised $11.4 million in 2017.

Early life and education
Lucca was born in 1978 in Rio de Janeiro, Brazil. She studied computer science at PUC University in Rio de Janeiro and has two MBAs in management and marketing. She worked in product and innovation with companies such as Globo TV and Vertu/Nokia.

Career
Lucca was the co-founder of WonderLuk, an online fashion marketplace that sold on demand 3D printed fashion accessories and jewellery until 2017. She was a co-founder of BOLDR, an AI assisted advisor that aims to help you become more self confident. She's also a co-founder of Bossa Studios, a video games developer and publisher. The company raised $11,4 million dollars in 2017. Lucca was on the BBC Girls Can Code, Disney's Minnie Challenge TV's programs.

Bossa Studios is a games development studio creators of titles such as Worlds Adrift, Monstermind, Surgeon Simulator, and I Am Bread, with its headquarters in London

Awards 
 BAFTA award for Bossa Studios. 
Forbes top 50 women in Tech.
 Voted Top 35 Women under 35 by Management Today.
  Top 30 Women in Games 
 everywoman's Entrepreneur of the Year finalist 
 UK Top 100 Influential People in Video Games

References

External links 
 

Living people
1978 births
Date of birth missing (living people)
British people of Brazilian descent
British company founders